Heikoin lenkki is the Finnish version of the internationally recognized show The Weakest Link, which debuted on BBC Two in August 2000. It was hosted by journalist Kirsi Salo. It premiered in 2002, but after three years, the show was axed due to the host's pregnancy. It was shown on the MTV3 network on Fridays at 8:35 pm.

Originally, nine contestants played for a prize of €15,000, but that was changed to eight players competing for €18,000.

Money tree

External links 
 

Finnish game shows
2002 Finnish television series debuts
2005 Finnish television series endings
2000s Finnish television series
The Weakest Link
MTV3 original programming
Nelonen original programming
Finnish non-fiction television series

fi:Heikoin lenkki#Suomen Heikoin lenkki